Finks-Harvey Plantation, also known as Woodland Park and Roseland, is a historic home located near Roanoke, Howard County, Missouri.  It was built between about 1873 and 1876, and is a two-story, five bay, Italianate style brick dwelling.  It features a bracketed cornice, projecting bays, quoins, and segmental-arched windows.

It was listed on the National Register of Historic Places in 1978.

References

Houses on the National Register of Historic Places in Missouri
Italianate architecture in Missouri
Houses completed in 1876
Buildings and structures in Howard County, Missouri
National Register of Historic Places in Howard County, Missouri